Storytellers Telling Stories is an episodic podcast created and hosted by writer and showrunner Jude Brewer, harkening back to the Golden Age of Radio as a "theatre of the mind" experience with writers, actors, and musicians. Consolidated into seasons and released weekly, the episodes range from just a few minutes to about an hour, with most hovering around the 30-minute mark, beginning with Brewer introducing the title of the story and that episode's featured author. The stories are either fiction or nonfiction, exploring a wide array of storytelling genres, from literary fiction to science fiction to magical realism, and noir fiction.

The first season consists entirely of authors reading short stories or excerpts from their published books. The second season introduces a featured songwriter for each episode, where the songwriter will play a live version of their song that loosely ties in with the story and the Season Two theme of "Endings". Brewer hosted a live performance of the podcast at the Literary Arts Portland Book Festival pre-show, Lit Crawl, for Season Two, featuring Kevin Sampsell, Margaret Malone, Tabitha Blankenbiller, Jennifer Robin, Brianna Barrett, and The Colin Trio.

Some notable appearances on the show are singer-songwriter, John Craigie, musician, Laura Hall, and comic book writer, Mark Russell. Several prominent authors have also been featured, among them being Monica Drake, Kevin Sampsell, Tammy Stoner, and Gina Ochsner. Season Two also features Luz from the Tender Loving Empire band, Y La Bamba.

The opening theme of the podcast begins with Brewer explaining the many different ways that listeners can experience a podcast, either through phone speakers, a car stereo, or earbuds. Two episodes introductions have deviated from this format, both episodes credited with Brewer as the featured performer. The finale for Season Two deviates the most, both lacking the show's intro music and featuring an extended monologue from Brewer.

The musical score for each episode in Season Two generally utilizes warped and distorted instruments sourced from the featured musician's song.

2019: series finale and Storybound 

The finale for Season Two is referred to as the "series finale" by Brewer, highlighting multiple storytellers from both seasons. The finale features 27 voices reading the work of author Traci Foust, as Foust had passed away the previous year.

A "surprise unveiling" and "major announcement" was rumored for Lit Crawl 2019, listing performers from the previous two seasons.

On October 22, 2019, Lit Hub announced a partnership with The Podglomerate, launching Storybound, a new podcast created and hosted by Brewer. Season One includes musicians who originally appeared on Storytellers Telling Stories, alongside critically acclaimed and bestselling authors such as Mitch Albom, Lidia Yuknavitch, Matt Gallagher, Kim Barnes, Adelle Waldman, Diksha Basu, Nathan Hill, Caitlin Doughty, as well as a story told by Jack Rhysider, creator of the popular podcast Darknet Diaries.

The new show aired December 3, exploring "everything from family life to friendship, relationships to histories, and how everything in life can be impacted by the power of a good story."

Episodes

See also 

 Music podcast

References

External links
 

Audio podcasts
2017 podcast debuts
Arts podcasts
Music podcasts
2019 podcast endings